Chiraidongri railway station is a small railway station in Mandla district, Madhya Pradesh. Its code is CID. It serves Chiraidongri village. The station consists of two platforms. The platforms are not well sheltered. It lacks many facilities including water and sanitation. Currently the section between Nainpur and Mandla Fort have been fully converted to Electrified Broadgauge line. From Nainpur Junction, the line connects to the fully converted Jabalpur–Gondia railway line, from narrow gauge to broad gauge. It is the nearest railway station from Kanha Tiger Reserve Mandla

References

Railway stations in Mandla district
Nagpur SEC railway division